Musco Creek is a stream in Madison and St. Francois counties in the U.S. state of Missouri. It is a tributary of the Little Saint Francis River.

The stream headwaters arise in St. Francois County north of Knob Lick and it flows generally south passing just west of Knob Lick. It flows roughly parallel to US Route 67 and enters Madison County. It enters the Little Saint Francis about two miles west of Mine La Motte.

Musco was named after a local Indian settler, according to local history.

See also
List of rivers of Missouri

References

Rivers of Madison County, Missouri
Rivers of St. Francois County, Missouri
Rivers of Missouri